Hjalmar "Jalmari" Holopainen (29 June 1892 – 3 April 1954) was a Finnish football player who competed in the 1912 Summer Olympics. He was a defender. In the 1912 Summer Olympics, he played all four matches that Finland played. During his career, he played the first six international matches with the Finnish national football team.

He was part of the HJK (Helsingin Jalkapalloklubi). When Jalmari Holopainen played in the team, HJK won the Finnish Championship in 1911, 1912, 1917 and 1918.

Jalmari Holopainen died at age 62 in 1954.

References

External links

1892 births
1954 deaths
Finnish footballers
Footballers at the 1912 Summer Olympics
Olympic footballers of Finland
Association football defenders
Finland international footballers
Helsingin Jalkapalloklubi players